The Elkhorn Ridge Wilderness is a  wilderness area located in Mendocino County, California. The redwood and mixed evergreen forests on coastal range ridges that make up this area is managed by the U.S. Bureau of Land Management. Wildlife in the area includes the northern spotted owl, bald eagles, and peregrine falcons.

References

External links
Elkhorn Ridge Wilderness - BLM
The Story of the Elkhorn Ridge Wilderness - California Wilderness Coalition

Wilderness areas of California
Mendocino County, California